Pondugula is a village in NTR district of the Indian state of Andhra Pradesh. It is located in Mylavaram mandal of Vijayawada revenue division. It is the second largest village in Mylavaram mandal.

References 

Villages in NTR district